Piscinamanna (also Pixina Manna) is a valley and a forest in southern Sardinia, near the town of Pula.

It hosts the main site of Technology Park of Sardinia (also called "POLARIS").

Main topics of the Park are ICT, Biotech, Energy .

The Park is hosting CRS4 research centre (http://www.crs4.it).

The Technology Park of Sardinia opened its doors in 2003. Since that time 65 companies and research centres have chosen to establish their research and development activities on its two campuses, giving rise to a thriving R&D community with excellent networking opportunities.

Valleys of Italy
Landforms of Sardinia
Province of Cagliari